Kelsie Hendry (born June 29, 1982 in Saskatoon, Saskatchewan) is a Canadian pole vaulter. Hendry set a historic milestone as the first-ever female athlete from Saskatoon to represent Canada at the Olympics. She also shared her three-way triumph with teammate Carly Dockendorf, and England's Kate Dennison for the bronze medal at the 2010 Commonwealth Games in Delhi, India.

Hendry achieved her first top-ten finish at the 2006 Commonwealth Games in Melbourne, Australia, where she was able to clear the height at 4.15 metres in women's pole vault. In 2008, she set both her personal best and a national record height of 4.55 metres at the Saskatchewan Provincial Championships in Prince Albert, and at the U.S.A. Track and Field High Performance Sprint and Power meet in Provo, Utah, which both guaranteed her a qualifying place for the Olympics. She also won back-to-back national titles at the Canadian Track and Field Championships in Windsor, Ontario to secure her place for the national Olympic team.

At the 2008 Summer Olympics in Beijing, Hendry competed for the women's pole vault, where she had cleared her best possible height of 4.30 metres in the qualifying rounds, finishing only in eighteenth place.

At the 2010 Commonwealth Games, Hendry captured her first top-level success by winning the bronze medal in the women's pole vault, after she cleared the height of 4.25 metres in the final round.

Hendry later emerged as a heavy favorite to qualify for her second Olympic games in London. She had already cleared an Olympic A-standard height of 4.50 metres, but finished with no result at the Canadian Track and Field Championships in Calgary, Alberta, after failing to reach a height of 4.20 metres in three attempts.

Hendry received a bachelor's degree in education at the University of Saskatchewan in Saskatoon. She also trains for the Riverside Athletics Club, under her personal and head coach Rick Petrucha.

Competition record

References

External links

Profile – Canadian Olympic Team
NBC 2008 Olympics profile

1982 births
Athletes (track and field) at the 2008 Summer Olympics
Athletes (track and field) at the 2006 Commonwealth Games
Athletes (track and field) at the 2010 Commonwealth Games
Canadian female pole vaulters
Living people
Olympic track and field athletes of Canada
Athletes from Saskatoon
Commonwealth Games bronze medallists for Canada
Commonwealth Games medallists in athletics
Medallists at the 2010 Commonwealth Games